Mariupol Raion is a raion (district) of Donetsk Oblast, Ukraine. It was created in July 2020 as part of the reform of administrative divisions of Ukraine. The center of the raion is the city of Mariupol. Population:

References

Raions of Donetsk Oblast
Ukrainian raions established during the 2020 administrative reform